Arthrochilus prolixus, commonly known as wispy elbow orchid, is a flowering plant in the orchid family (Orchidaceae) and is endemic to eastern Australia. It has a rosette of bluish green leaves at its base and up to twenty two pale green, insect-like flowers with dark reddish to purplish glands on its labellum.

Description
Arthrochilus prolixus is a terrestrial, perennial, deciduous, sympodial herb with an underground tuber which produces daughter tubers on the end of root-like stolons. The lateral sepals and petals are turned back against the ovary. The column is light green to whitish with purplish spots, strongly curved, with two pairs of curved wings. Flowering occurs from December to February.

Taxonomy and naming
Arthrochilus prolixus was first formally described in 1991 by David Jones from a specimen collected near Wauchope. The description was published in Australian Orchid Research. The specific epithet (prolixus) is a Latin word meaning "stretched out long", referring to the long labellum calli.

Distribution and habitat
The wispy elbow orchid grows with grass and shrubs in forest between Manly in New South Wales and south-eastern Queensland. The largest population is in the Bulahdelah district. One colony has established itself in rotting sawdust at a sawmill.

Ecology
As with other Arthrochilus orchids, A. prolixus is pollinated by male thynnid wasps of the genus Arthrothynnus although the species involved is not known. It also reproduces asexually by producing new tubers.

References 

prolixus
Plants described in 1991
Orchids of New South Wales
Orchids of Queensland